Mark Gleason (born November 26, 1953) is an American politician in the state of Minnesota. He served in the Minnesota House of Representatives.

References

Democratic Party members of the Minnesota House of Representatives
1953 births
Living people